Arthur Theodore Bergan is a Canadian civil engineer (specializing in transportation engineering), a professor, and a leader in Canadian transportation safety research. He supervised the construction of numerous highways and the development of Transport Canada's Transportation Centers.  He also supervised the development of the Weigh-in-Motion Scale, designed to weigh vehicles passing over computer-assisted scales at speeds up to 70 miles per hour.

Biography
Arthur Bergan was born in Assiniboia, Saskatchewan, graduated from high school in 1949 and began working at the provincial Department of Highways in 1951 . He attended the University of Saskatchewan, obtaining a bachelor's degree in civil engineering in 1961, his Master of Science in Soil Mechanics from UofL in 1964, and a Ph.D. in Pavement Design for Heavy Loads from the University of California, Berkeley in 1968.

During his career Bergan supervised the design and construction of highways, many in previously undeveloped regions in the north and northeastern Saskatchewan. An estimated 500 miles of Saskatchewan highway were built under his supervision, through such challenging terrain as permafrost and muskeg.

In the 1970s, Bergan was instrumental in establishing the University of Saskatchewan's Transportation Research Centre to conduct research and training in areas such as transportation systems, safety, and economics. One of Bergan's first projects as the center's director was a study of seatbelt effectiveness. In 1978, Saskatchewan became the first province in Canada to legislate the use of seatbelts. Bergan's most important success may very well be the lead role he has played in improving highway efficiency and safety. In 2003, he was inducted into the Saskatchewan Transportation Hall of Fame. 

Bergan was also instrumental in establishing a network of transportation centers across Canada, under the mandate of Transport Canada. The network has evolved into Canada's lead center of excellence in transportation safety research, with research centers located across Canada, including the University of Saskatchewan. 

In the late 1970s, Bergan led the development of a weigh-in-motion scale, capable of weighing trucks travelling at highway speeds. This new technology led to the formation in 1980 of International Road Dynamics (IRD), a Saskatoon company specializing in the area of weigh-in-motion, commercial vehicle operations enforcement, and intelligent transportation systems. Under Bergan's leadership as chairman of the board, IRD has become an international leader in intelligent transportation systems (ITS). The company produces and markets its technologies around the world, generating gross annual revenues of $20 million. IRD directly employs 140 people, and contracts with many local suppliers and tradespeople.

Development of Weigh-in-Motion Scale In the late 1970s, transportation engineers under the direction of U of S Professor Art Bergan developed a prototype of automatic, weigh-in-motion scales. The technology is designed to weigh vehicles passing over computer-assisted scales at speeds up to 70 miles per hour, and with axle weights up to 50,000 pounds each. Similar scales using advanced technologies are now widely used throughout North America by International Road Dynamics, a company headed by Art Bergan's son, Terry.

Bergan has authored numerous refereed journals and conference proceedings; served on college, national, and international professional committees; was appointed president of the Canadian Technical Asphalt Association, and served as assistant dean of the College of Engineering from 1978 to 1983. He is a member of the Association of Professional Engineers of Saskatchewan and other engineering and transportation associations.

References

External links
Irdinc.com
Usask.ca

Transport engineers
University of Saskatchewan alumni
Living people
1930s births